Communauté d'agglomération Grand Montauban is the communauté d'agglomération, an intercommunal structure, centred on the city of Montauban. It is located in the Tarn-et-Garonne department, in the Occitania region, southern France. Created in 1999, its seat is in Montauban. Its area is 280.9 km2. Its population was 78,505 in 2019, of which 61,372 in Montauban proper.

Composition
The communauté d'agglomération consists of the following 11 communes:

Albefeuille-Lagarde
Bressols
Corbarieu
Escatalens
Lacourt-Saint-Pierre
Lamothe-Capdeville
Montauban
Montbeton
Reyniès
Saint-Nauphary
Villemade

References

Montauban
Montauban